James Foley (born December 28, 1953) is an American film director. His 1986 film At Close Range was entered into the 36th Berlin International Film Festival.  Other films he has directed include Glengarry Glen Ross, based on the play of the same name by David Mamet, and The Chamber, based on the novel of the same name by author John Grisham. He also directed the two sequels to Fifty Shades of Grey: Fifty Shades Darker (2017) and Fifty Shades Freed (2018).

Early life
Foley was born in Bay Ridge, Brooklyn, New York, the son of a lawyer. He graduated from the State University of New York at Buffalo, a flagship school of the SUNY system, in 1978. He continued his education earning an M.F.A in film study and production from the University of Southern California.  Despite many people thinking so, he is not related to John Foley of Shawnee, Kansas.

Career
In 1984, Foley made his directorial debut with Reckless, which starred Aidan Quinn and Daryl Hannah. He directed Glengarry Glen Ross in 1992. The Corruptor, his action film starring Chow Yun-Fat and Mark Wahlberg, was released in 1999. His 2003 film, Confidence, starred Edward Burns. He directed Perfect Stranger, a thriller film starring Halle Berry, in 2007.

Filmography
Films
 Reckless (1984)
 At Close Range (1986)
 Who's That Girl (1987)
 After Dark, My Sweet (1990) (Also writer)
 Glengarry Glen Ross (1992)
 Two Bits (1995)
 The Chamber (1996)
 Fear (1996)
 The Corruptor (1999)
 Confidence (2003)
 Perfect Stranger (2007)
 Fifty Shades Darker (2017)
 Fifty Shades Freed (2018)

Television

Music videos
Besides the film Who's That Girl (1987), Foley directed the following music videos for Madonna (under the pseudonym "Peter Percher"):

"Live to Tell" (1986)
"Papa Don't Preach" (1986)
"True Blue" (1986)

Foley was also the best man at Madonna's wedding to Sean Penn.

Awards and nominations
Berlin Film Festival

Deauville American Film Festival

Golden Raspberry Awards

Phoenix Film Festival

Venice Film Festival

References

External links
 
 

1953 births
Living people
American music video directors
American television directors
Film directors from New York City
People from Bay Ridge, Brooklyn
University at Buffalo alumni